Norman Alexander MacCaig DLitt  (14 November 1910 – 23 January 1996) was a Scottish poet and teacher. His poetry, in modern English, is known for its humour, simplicity of language and great popularity.

Life
Norman Alexander MacCaig was born at 15 East London Street, Edinburgh, to Robert McCaig (1880–1950?), a chemist from Dumfriesshire, and Joan née MacLeod (1879–1959), from Scalpay in the Outer Hebrides. He was their fourth child and only son. He attended the Royal High School and in 1928 went to the University of Edinburgh, graduating in 1932 with a degree in classics. He divided his time, for the rest of his life, between his native city and Assynt in the Scottish Highlands.

During the Second World War MacCaig registered as a conscientious objector, a move that many at the time criticised. Douglas Dunn has suggested that MacCaig's career later suffered as a result of his outspoken pacifism, although there is no evidence of this. For the early part of his working life, he was employed as a school teacher in primary schools. In 1967 he was appointed Fellow in Creative Writing at Edinburgh. He became a reader in poetry in 1970 at the University of Stirling. He spent his summer holidays in Achmelvich, and Inverkirkaig, near Lochinver.

His first collection, Far Cry, was published in 1943. He continued to publish throughout his lifetime and was prolific in the amount that he produced. After his death a still larger collection of unpublished poems was found. MacCaig often gave public readings of his work in Edinburgh and elsewhere; these were extremely popular and for many people were the first introduction to the poet. His life is also noteworthy for the friendships he had with a number of other Scottish poets, such as Hugh MacDiarmid and Douglas Dunn. He described his own religious beliefs as "Zen Calvinism", a comment typical of his half-humorous, half-serious approach to life.

Work

Early
MacCaig's first two books were deeply influenced by the New Apocalypse movement of the thirties and forties, one of a number of literary movements that were constantly coalescing, evolving and dissolving at that time. Later he was to all but disown these works, dismissing them as obscure and meaningless. His poetic rebirth took place with the publication of Riding Lights in 1955. It was a complete contrast to his earlier works, being strictly formal, metrical, rhyming and utterly lucid. The timing of the publication was such that he could have been associated with The Movement, a poetic grouping of poets at just that time. Indeed many of the forms and themes of his work fitted with the ideas of The Movement but he remained separate from that group, perhaps on account of his Scottishness—all of the Movement poets were English. One label that has been attached to MacCaig and one that he seemed to enjoy (as an admirer of John Donne) is Metaphysical.

Later

In later years he relaxed some of the formality of his work, losing the rhymes and strict metricality but always strove to maintain the lucidity. He became a free verse poet with the publication of Surroundings in 1966. Seamus Heaney described his work as "an ongoing education in the marvellous possibilities of lyric poetry." Ted Hughes wrote, "whenever I meet his poems, I'm always struck by their undated freshness, everything about them is alive, as new and essential, as ever." Another poet, beside Donne, whom MacCaig claimed was a great influence on his work was Louis MacNeice. Although he never lost his sense of humour, much of his very late work, following the death of his wife in 1990, is more sombre in tone. The poems appear to be full of heartbreak but they never become pessimistic.

An example of this is his poem "Praise of a Man" which was quoted by Gordon Brown in the eulogy he gave at the funeral of Robin Cook in 2005:The beneficent lights dim
but don't vanish.
The razory edges
dull, but still cut.
He's gone:
but you can see
his tracks still, in the snow of the world.A verse of MacCaig's poem Moorings is cited on the reverse side of the new 10-pound polymer banknote that was introduced by the Royal Bank of Scotland in 2017.

In schools 
MacCaig's poems are studied in Scottish schools at National 5 and Higher levels, the poems which are currently studied are: 

 Assisi 
 Visiting Hour
 Basking Shark 
 Brooklyn Cop
 Hotel Room, 12th Floor
 Aunt Julia

Awards
 1985 Queen's Gold Medal for Poetry
 1979 Order of the British Empire
 1975 Cholmondeley Award

Bibliography

Poetry
 Far Cry. London: Routledge, 1943.
 The Inward Eye. London: Routledge, 1946.
 Riding Lights. London: Hogarth Press, 1955.
 The Sinai Sort. London: Hogarth Press, 1957.
 A Common Grace. London: Chatto & Windus, 1960.
 A Round of Applause. London: Chatto & Windus, 1962.
 Contemporary Scottish Verse, 1959–1969 (Edinburgh: Calder & Boyards, 1970).
 Measures. London: Chatto & Windus, 1965.
 Surroundings. London: Chatto & Windus, 1967.
 Rings on a Tree. Chatto & Windus, 1968.
 Visiting Hour. London: 1968.
 A Man in My Position. London: Chatto & Windus, 1969.
 Selected Poems (1979).
 The White Bird. London: Chatto & Windus, 1973.
 The World's Room. London: Chatto & Windus, 1974.
 Tree of Strings. London: Chatto & Windus, 1977.
 Old Maps and New. London: Chatto & Windus, 1978.
 The Equal Skies. London: Chatto & Windus: Hogarth Press, 1980.
 A World of Difference. London: Chatto & Windus, 1983.
 Voice Over. London: Chatto & Windus, 1989.
 Collected Poems (revised and expanded edn, 1993).
 Assisi. Italy
 An Ordinary Day
 Brooklyn Cop
 Aunt Julia

Anthologies

References

Further reading
 Smith, Iain Crichton (1959), The Poetry of Norman MacCaig, in Reid, Alexander (ed.), Saltire Review, Volume 6, No. 19, Autumn 1959, The Saltire Society, Edinburgh, pp. 20 - 23
 Fulton, Robin (1963), Selves, Myths and Landscapes: The Poetry of Norman MacCaig, in Magnusson, Magnus (ed.). New Saltire No. 10: December 1963, New Saltire Ltd., Edinburgh, pp. 20 - 23 
 Ross, Raymond J. (1982), Interview with Norman MacCaig, in Murray, Glen (ed.), Cencrastus No. 8, Spring 1982, pp. 15 & 16,

External links
The Write Stuff at National Library of Scotland
Film interview Norman MacCaig: a man in my position
MacCaig on BBC.co.uk 
Interview with Jennie Renton
Obituary

Portrait of Norman MacCaig by Alex Main, Scottish National Portrait Gallery
Norman MacCaig Collection at the University of Stirling Archive

1910 births
1996 deaths
People educated at the Royal High School, Edinburgh
Officers of the Order of the British Empire
Scottish conscientious objectors
Scottish Renaissance
Academics from Edinburgh
Alumni of the University of Edinburgh
Scottish schoolteachers
Academics of the University of Edinburgh
Academics of the University of Stirling
20th-century Scottish poets
Scottish male poets
20th-century British male writers
Writers from Edinburgh